Yvonne Rogers  is a British psychologist and computer scientist. She serves as director of the Interaction Centre at University College London. She has authored or contributed to more than 250 publications. Her book Interaction Design: Beyond Human-Computer Interaction written with Jenny Preece and Helen Sharp (5th Edition, 2019) has sold more than 200,000 copies worldwide and has been translated into six other languages.  Her work is described in Encounters with HCI Pioneers: A Personal History and Photo Journal.

Early life 
She earned a Bachelor of Arts degree in psychology from University of Wales in 1982, Master of Science degree ergonomics from University College London in 1983, and PhD in human-computer interaction from University of Wales in 1988.

Career and research
Rogers served as a professor of school of Cognitive and Computing Sciences at Sussex University from 1992 to 2003, Professor in Informatics from 2003 to 2006 at Indiana University, and Professor of HCI at Open University from 2006 to 2011. She is professor and director of The University College London Interaction Centre at University College London. She was Principal Investigator and Co-Investigator of over 30 research grants from EPSRC, ESRC, AHRC, EU and NIH. She is known for her work on iconic interface to human-centre AI and a research agenda of user engagement in ubiquitous computing.

Rogers was a principal investigator for the ICRI project in collaboration with Intel. She led projects such as Visualising Mill Road, where they collected community data and visualized it as street art, and the Tidy Street project, visualising energy usage and efficiency from power meters. From 2000 to 2007, Rogers contributed to the UK Equator Project as a principal investigator, researching the relationship between physical and digital user experiences. One of the projects was "Ambient Wood", encouraging children to explore biological processes in a forest using wireless probes.

Rogers worked on a project using ambient light to nudge people to take the stairs rather than the elevator. She worked on the Lambent Shopping Trolly Project, building a lambent display that clips onto any shopping trolley to nudge buying decisions.

Rogers worked on an augmented reality (AR) project to "try on" makeup and see how this AR influences buying decisions.

Awards and honours 
 Fellow of the British Computer Society
 EPSRC dream fellowship
 SIGCHI Lifetime Research Award 2022 
 Elected into SIGCHI CHI Academy 2012
 Osher Fellow 2015
 Milner Award 2022
 Fellow of the Royal Society 2022

Books 
Her publications include:

Papers 
 Yvonne Rogers, Judi Ellis, Distributed cognition: an alternative framework for analysing and explaining collaborative working, (1994), Journal of Information Technology
 Michael Scaife, Yvonne Rogers, External cognition: how do graphical representations work?, (1996), International Journal of Human-Computer Studies
 Yvonne Rogers, Antonio Rizzo, Mike Scaife, Interdisciplinarity: an Emergent or Engineered Process?, (2003), University of Sussex
 Michael Scaife, Yvonne Rogers, Frances Aldrich, Matt Davies, Designing for or designing with? Informant design for interactive learning environments, (2006), CHI '97 Proceedings of the ACM SIGCHI Conference on Human factors in computing systems
 Yvonne Rogers, Moving on from Weiser's Vision of Calm Computing: Engaging UbiComp Experiences, (2006), International Conference on Ubiquitous Computing
 Richard Harper , Tom Rodden , Yvonne Rogers, Abigail Sellen , Human-Computer Interaction in the Year 2020, (2008), Microsoft Research

References

Living people
Fellows of the Royal Society
Academics of the University of Sussex
Alumni of University College London
Alumni of the University of Wales
British women computer scientists
British women psychologists
Indiana University faculty
Year of birth missing (living people)